Kim Norton (born September 22, 1957) is an American politician serving as the current mayor of Rochester, Minnesota. She previously served in the Minnesota House of Representatives as a Democrat, representing District 25B, which consists mostly of the northern portion of the city of Rochester. She was elected to become the first female mayor of Rochester in a nonpartisan race in November 2018.

Early life, education, and career
Norton was born in Miami Beach, Florida at a military base. She earned a B.S. in Human Development and Special Education, specializing in Early Childhood Education, at the University of Nebraska in Lincoln. She also attended graduate school there, studying Deaf Education, Behavioral Impairments and Curriculum.

Norton served on several committees in the Minnesota Department of Children, Families and Learning from 1998–2003 and, upon returning to Rochester, served on the Rochester School Board (as clerk in 2001, chair in 2005, and treasurer in 2006) prior to being elected to the House.

Political career

Norton first ran against incumbent Rep. Fran Bradley in 2004, an election she lost by 311 votes. She ran again in 2006, defeating Republican challenger Rich Decker by just 99 votes. In 2008, she easily won re-election against Republican challenger Jason Johnson. In 2010, she was re-elected over Republican challenger Mike Rolih.

Norton stated in September 2015 that she would not seek re-election in the 2016 election saying "I've made the decision, after a couple of years of consideration, that it's time for me to retire, so I am not going to run for re-election in 2016. It makes me a little sad, I will say, but at the same time it feels like the right thing to do and the right time to do it."

Norton said that following her announcement not to run for reelection to the Minnesota House of Representatives that she was "fed-up" with partisan politics, and since leaving the House, she has worked to stay out of party politics. During her tenure as a state representative, she was widely viewed as a moderate, with a history of going against the DFL on some issues.

Election history

Personal life
Norton has four children: Chris, Cody, Katherine, and Kelsey.

See also
List of mayors of Rochester, Minnesota

References

External links 

 Project Votesmart Profile: Rep. Kim Norton

Living people
1957 births
21st-century American politicians
21st-century American women politicians
Democratic Party members of the Minnesota House of Representatives
Mayors of Rochester, Minnesota
Politicians from Rochester, Minnesota
Women state legislators in Minnesota
Women mayors of places in Minnesota